Mysteries at the Museum is an hour-long television program on the Travel Channel which features museum artifacts of unusual or mysterious origins.

Plot
Each episode is focused on interesting and unusual artifacts held in museums. The show is hosted by Don Wildman, the executive producer is David Gerber, and the show is produced by Optomen Productions under the executive producers Nicola Moody and Dominic Stobart.

Episodes

Series overview

Season 1 (2010-2011)

Season 2 (2011-2012)

Season 3 (2012-2013)

Season 4 (2013)

Season 5 (2014)

Season 6 (2014)

Season 7 (2015)

Season 8 (2015-2016)

Season 9 (2016)

Season 10 (2016) 
Season 10 debuted a new opening and graphics.

Season 11 (2016)

Season 12 (2016)

Season 13 (2017)

Season 14 (2017)

Season 15 (2017)

Season 16 (2017)

Season 17 (2017-2018)

Season 18 (2018)

Season 19 (2018)

Season 20 (2018)

Season 21 (2018)

Season 22 (2018)

Specials 
In the specials, Don Wildman personally visits sites and views artifacts related to a single subject.

Legacy
Mysteries at the Museum is a successful series, and spawned a spin-off from its Monumental Mysteries: A Mysteries at the Museum Special called Monumental Mysteries. Monumental Mysteries and two other Travel Channel series called Hotel Secrets & Legends and Castle Secrets & Legends have been renamed Mysteries at the Monument, Mysteries at the Hotel, and Mysteries at the Castle, respectively, to capitalize on the Mysteries at the Museum name.
A conspiracy show called Mysteries at the National Parks has also been developed and broadcast. The show also spawned a series of specials such as the Greatest Mysteries specials.

References

External links 

2010s American mystery television series
2010 American television series debuts
Travel Channel original programming
English-language television shows
Television series featuring reenactments